was an athletic stadium in Nishinomiya, Hyogo, Japan.

Japan national football team used this stadium in 1940.

External links

Defunct sports venues in Japan
Defunct football venues in Japan
Sports venues in Hyōgo Prefecture